Mogaligundla Baga Reddy was an Indian politician who served as a member of parliament for four terms and as a member of Andhra Pradesh Legislature seven times. He was the speaker of the Andhra Pradesh legislative assembly for a period of one month and a cabinet minister. He served as the Leader of the Opposition in the Andhra Pradesh Legislative Assembly from 1984 to 1989.

Early life and political career
Reddy was born on 17 June 1930 in the village of Malchalma, Medak District in India. Born into an agriculture based family, he completed his secondary education in Bidar (Karnataka) and went on to complete his B.A. L.L.B. from Osmania University in Hyderabad. He campaigned for Indira Gandhi in Medak district where she was elected as the prime minister of India in the 1980s. He was first elected to the Andhra Pradesh legislative assembly on the Congress party ticket at an age of 26 from the Zaheerabad constituency in Medak District. Since then he has been voted back to the assembly seven consecutive times. He retained his assembly seat in both 1983 and 1985 assembly elections despite there being a wave of N.T. Rama Rao's Telugu Desam Party. Reddy, held key portfolios such as Panchayati Raj, Major Industries and Revenue between 1978 and 1983 when Marri Chenna Reddy was the Chief Minister of the state. From 1989 to 1999 he served as the member of Lok Sabha from Medak constituency for four consecutive terms on Indian National Congress ticket. In 1999 Reddy lost his seat to Ale Narendra of Bharatiya Janata Party.

References

Indian National Congress politicians from Andhra Pradesh
India MPs 1989–1991
India MPs 1991–1996
India MPs 1996–1997
India MPs 1998–1999
Telugu politicians
Telangana politicians
1930 births
Living people
Osmania University alumni
Members of the Andhra Pradesh Legislative Assembly
Speakers of the Andhra Pradesh Legislative Assembly
State cabinet ministers of Andhra Pradesh
People from Medak district
Lok Sabha members from Andhra Pradesh
Leaders of the Opposition in the Andhra Pradesh Legislative Assembly